Thomasine & Bushrod is a 1974 Western film directed by Gordon Parks, Jr., written by and starring Max Julien and Vonetta McGee and was released by Columbia Pictures. The title song was written by Arthur Lee and performed by his band Love.

Vonetta McGee plays Thomasine and Max Julien plays Bushrod in a film intended as a counterpart to the 1967 film Bonnie and Clyde. Thomasine and Bushrod go on a crime spree through the American south between 1911 and 1915.

Plot 
In Texas in 1911, Thomasine knocks out a man who attempted to force himself on her sexually without paying for her prostitution services. She is revealed to actually be a bounty hunter who used her attractiveness to lure in her latest, unsuspecting target. The marshal pays her the bounty, but also threatens her because he does not care for her self-confident attitude. While at the jail she sees a wanted poster of her former boyfriend, Bushrod. She tracks him down and they resume their relationship. Bushrod kills a notorious bank robber nicknamed "Adolph the Butcher", who had murdered his sister. Moments later the marshal arrives on the scene, and he is about to arrest Bushrod but Thomasine intervenes and they get away.

Fugitives, Thomasine and Bushrod take up robbing banks. They do so traveling in the automobiles that are starting to replace horses throughout the country. They are always closely followed by a posse led by the increasingly vengeful marshal. Bushrod gives the stolen money to the African Americans, Mexicans, Native Americans and poor whites with whom they associate, which earns the couple some favorable publicity in the popular press. However, the pregnant Thomasine wants to build a nest egg with the money and move away to a more stable life. They are joined at their hideout by their Jamaican-born friend, Jomo, who has a more casual approach to criminal life.

Jomo is caught on a visit to town, and refuses to tell the marshal where his friends are, even though the marshal is hanging him up by his hands; the marshal then drops him into a pit of poisonous snakes. Thomasine and Bushrod go looking for him in a new car Jomo had gotten for them, but themselves fall into a trap, surrounded by the marshal and many gunmen; Thomasine is shot in the back and killed. The enraged Bushrod charges the marshal, who shoots him in the chest, but Bushrod pushes on and shoots the marshal in the head and kills him. The film ends with a flashback to a previous scene of Thomasine and Bushrod happily splashing each other with water in a stream.

Cast 
 Max Julien as J.P. Bushrod
 Vonetta McGee as Thomasine
 George Murdock as US Marshal Bogardie
 Glynn Turman as Jomo J. Anderson
 Juanita Moore as Pecolia
 Ben Zeller as Scruggs

See also
 List of American films of 1974

References

External links 
 Thomasine & Bushrod via Internet Movie Database
 
 
 

1970s crime films
1974 Western (genre) films
1974 films
American crime films
Blaxploitation films
Films directed by Gordon Parks Jr.
Films set in the 1910s
Columbia Pictures films
African-American films
African-American Western (genre) films
1970s English-language films
1970s American films